The Horse Valley Ranch, near Littlefield, Arizona, which has also been known as Waring Ranch, dates from 1916.  A  area of the ranch was listed on the National Register of Historic Places in 1984.  The listing included two contributing buildings, two other contributing structures, and a contributing site. The ranch was acquired by the National Park Service in 1967-1968 and is now part of Grand Canyon–Parashant National Monument.

References

External links
 
  - BLM
 
 

Ranches in Arizona
Ranches on the National Register of Historic Places in Arizona
Buildings and structures completed in 1916
Buildings and structures in Mohave County, Arizona
Historic American Landscapes Survey in Arizona
National Register of Historic Places in Mohave County, Arizona